Ethmia timberlakei is a moth in the family Depressariidae. It is found in California, United States.

The ground color of the forewings is dark gray, sparsely to densely irrorated (speckled) with scattered white scales. The ground color of the hindwings is uniform pale gray.

The larvae feed on Phacelia ramosissima var. suffrutescens.

References

Moths described in 1973
timberlakei